Blepharomastix hedychroalis is a moth in the family Crambidae first described by Charles Swinhoe in 1907. It is found on the Andaman Islands in the Indian Ocean.

References

Moths described in 1907
Blepharomastix